Joseph-Alfred Mousseau  (July 17, 1837 – March 30, 1886), was a Canadian lawyer and politician, who served in the federal Cabinet and also as the sixth premier of Quebec.

Biography 
He was born in Sainte-Geneviève-de-Berthier, Lower Canada, the son of Louis Mousseau, the son of Alexis Mousseau, and Sophie Duteau, dit Grandpré. Mousseau was first elected to the House of Commons of Canada as a Conservative Member of Parliament in the 1874 election for the riding of Bagot, and was re-elected three times. In 1880, he was elevated to the Cabinet of Prime Minister Sir John A. Macdonald, serving first as president of the Queen's Privy Council of Canada, and then as Secretary of State for Canada.

Exchanging places with Joseph-Adolphe Chapleau, Mousseau left federal politics to become the sixth Premier of the province of Quebec from July 31, 1882. He served until his resignation on January 22, 1884, after being appointed as a puisne judge of the Superior Court for the district of Rimouski. He died in Montreal in 1886.

His brother Joseph Octave Mousseau was also a member of the Canadian House of Commons.

Electoral record 

|-
  
|Conservative
|Joseph-Alfred Mousseau
|align="right"| acclaimed

See also
Politics of Quebec
Timeline of Quebec history
List of Quebec general elections

References
 
 

1837 births
1886 deaths
Lawyers in Quebec
Judges in Quebec
Members of the House of Commons of Canada from Quebec
Conservative Party of Canada (1867–1942) MPs
Premiers of Quebec
Members of the King's Privy Council for Canada
Quebec political party leaders
Conservative Party of Quebec MNAs
Burials at Notre Dame des Neiges Cemetery